Keiichi is a masculine Japanese given name. Notable people with the name include:

, Japanese photographer
, Japanese manga artist
, Japanese diplomat
, Japanese music director
, Japanese molecular biologist
, Japanese butterfly swimmer
, Japanese photographer
, Japanese Paralympic swimmer
, Japanese voice actor
, Japanese voice actor
, Japanese voice actor
, Japanese music producer
, Japanese music composer
, Japanese film director
, Japanese shogi player
, Japanese light novel author
, Japanese voice actor
, Japanese music composer
, Japanese speed skater
, also known as the Drift King, Japanese racing driver
, video game designer

Fictional characters
, a character in the sound novel Higurashi no Naku Koro ni
, a character in the manga series Oh My Goddess!
, a character in the manga series Junjo Romantica

Japanese masculine given names